The women's artistic gymnastics all-around at the 2018 Summer Youth Olympics was held at the America Pavilion on October 12.

Qualification 

Qualification took place over four days from October 7-10. Anastasiia Bachynska from Ukraine qualified in first, followed by Italy's Giorgia Villa and Tang Xijing of China.

The reserves were:

Medalists

Results 
Oldest and youngest competitors

References 

Gymnastics at the 2018 Summer Youth Olympics